Londrina (literally "Little London") is a city located in the north of the state of Paraná, South Region, Brazil, and is  away from the state capital, Curitiba. It is the second largest city in the state and fourth largest in the southern region of the country, with 588,125 inhabitants in the city proper (2022) It has a Human Development Index of 0.778.  

Londrina was originally explored by British settlers, and then officially established in 1930 by a small group of Italian, Japanese and German settlers. It rapidly became the commercial, political, and cultural centre of the state's northern pioneer zone. Its universities include the Universidade Estadual de Londrina (Londrina State University) and the Universidade Tecnológica Federal do Paraná  (Federal University of Technology - Paraná).

Demography
The city was named after British entrepreneurs who launched railroad stations in the region to ease the transportation of coffee grains from northern Paraná and southern São Paulo states to the port of Santos. The word Londrina pays homage to the British capital (Londres in Portuguese), since a London cotton company, Paraná Plantations Limited, made the original investment to settle in this area.

Geography

Climate
According to the Köppen-Geiger climate classification system, Londrina has a humid subtropical climate (Cfa) influenced by the Atlantic Forest biome.

Economy

Agriculture continues to be Londrina's major economic activity, although its importance has diminished in recent years. Agricultural activity was diversified beyond coffee, and today corn, wheat, cotton, horticulture, beans, peanuts, rice, sugar cane, soy bean, and fruit plantations thrive due to the rich Northern Paraná/South Western São Paulo State "terra roxa/vermelha" crimson soil. Although the city has increased its industrial park by adding weaving, textiles and agricultural factories, Londrina's main wealth continues to be agricultural production. Today, Londrina is also known for its commerce and service sectors. Moreover, real estate is another growing sector that has generated jobs and boosted even more the size of this city in Paraná.

It possesses one of the largest universities in the country, the Londrina State University, as well as several private colleges.

The city is served by Londrina – Governador José Richa Airport.

Once a year, the city hosts the largest agricultural fair in Latin America, the Expo Londrina.

Health
Londrina is served by both universal health care system, through the Sistema Único de Saúde (SUS) and by many private health care facilities. The municipality has 133 SUS health facilities, such as hospitals, local clinics and nurseries. Despite ample access to healthcare, infant mortality rate are relatively high, with 10.68 deaths per one thousand births as of 2017.

Education

Portuguese is the official national language, and thus the primary language taught in schools.  But English and Spanish are part of the official high school curriculum. As of 2010, the rate of formal schooling is 97.3%  between the age of 6 and 14 years old. The basic education system has 65.065 enrolled and the middle/high school system has 18,140 students as of 2018.

Colleges and universities
 Universidade Estadual de Londrina (UEL) - "Londrina State University"
 Universidade Tecnológica Federal do Paraná (UTFPR) - "Federal University of Technology - Paraná"
 Pontifícia Universidade Católica do Paraná (PUC-PR) - "Pontifical Catholic University of Paraná"
 Universidade Norte do Paraná (UNOPAR) - "North Paraná University"
 Centro Universitário Filadéfia (UniFil) - "Filadélfia University Center"
 Faculdade Pitágoras - "Pitágoras College"
 Faculdade Arthur Thomas (FAAT) - "Arthur Thomas College"
 Faculdade Teologica Sul Americana (FTSA) - "South American Theological College"

Metropolitan region of Londrina
Instituted by State Complementary Law 81 on 17 June 1998, the Metropolitan Region of Londrina includes the cities of Londrina, Cambé, Ibiporã, Sertanópolis, Bela Vista do Paraíso, Jataizinho, Rolândia, Tamarana and Arapongas totaling 750 thousand inhabitants.

Religion
The city is the seat of the Roman Catholic Archdiocese of Londrina. The city is also home to two stakes of the Church of Jesus Christ of Latter-day Saints as well as the headquarter of the Brazil Londrina Mission, which encompasses northern Paraná and parts of São Paulo.

Sports
The city's football clubs include Londrina Esporte Clube, founded in 1956, and the Associação Portuguesa Londrinense founded in 1950. They play at Café stadium, a 45,000 spectator capacity stadium.

Inesul/Londrina, owned by INESUL - Instituto de Ensino Superior de Londrina, a higher education institution, is a city's major basketball club and competes in the Campeonato Brasileiro de Basquete.

Notable people
Arrigo Barnabé, musician
Dionatan Teixeira, footballer
Everson Maciel, footballer
Flávia de Oliveira, model
Giovane Élber, footballer
Rafinha, footballer
Jádson, footballer
Naldo, footballer
Fernandinho, footballer
Mario Sergio Cortella, philosopher
Michelle Alves, model
Victor Lazzarini, composer
Gilberto Godoy (Giba), volleyball player
Pedro Rezende, youtuber
Rogério Romero, swimmer
Marcão, footballer
André Lópes, musician (Bassist in Latin pop band, 'Bacilos')
Daiane Limeira, footballer

Twin towns – sister cities

Londrina is twinned with:

 Guimarães, Portugal
 Modena, Italy
 León, Nicaragua
 Nago, Japan

 Toledo, United States
 Zhenjiang, China

References

External links

Official website 
Official homepage 

 
1930 establishments in Brazil
Populated places established in 1930